The 2018–19 Dhaka Premier Division Twenty20 Cricket League was the first edition of the Dhaka Premier Division Twenty20 Cricket League, a Twenty20 cricket competition that was held in Bangladesh. It started on 25 February 2019 and concluded on 4 March 2019. The tournament took place directly before the 2018–19 Dhaka Premier Division Cricket League, and features the same twelve teams. The final of the competition was played as a night game at the Sher-e-Bangla National Stadium in Mirpur.

The Bangladesh Cricket Board (BCB) instigated the tournament in order to give Bangladeshi players more experience in the 20-over format, in the hope that local players will become more prominent in the Bangladesh Premier League. For this reason the tournament featured local cricketers exclusively, unlike the Dhaka Premier Division Cricket League, in which foreign players take part. 

Shinepukur Cricket Club were the first team to qualify for the semi-finals of the tournament, after they won their two matches in Group C. On the final day of the group stage, Prime Bank Cricket Club from Group A and Sheikh Jamal Dhanmondi Club from Group B also progressed to the semi-finals. The final match in Group D, between Gazi Group Cricketers and Prime Doleshwar Sporting Club was washed out, so the fixture was rescheduled for the reserve day to determine which team progresses. Prime Doleshwar Sporting Club won the rescheduled match by three wickets, winning Group D and becoming the fourth team to advance to the semi-finals.

In the first semi-final, Sheikh Jamal Dhanmondi Club beat Shinepukur Cricket Club by five wickets, with man of the match Ziaur Rahman finishing unbeaten on 72 runs from just 29 balls. The second semi-final saw Prime Doleshwar Sporting Club beat Prime Bank Cricket Club by six wickets, with their captain, Farhad Reza, taking five wickets for 32 runs.

Sheikh Jamal Dhanmondi Club won the tournament, after they beat Prime Doleshwar Sporting Club by 24 runs in the final. Imtiaz Hossain was named as the man of the match, after scoring 56 runs, and Farhad Reza was named as the player of the tournament, following his all-round performance. Following the conclusion of the competition, the BCB confirmed their intentions to have the tournament as a permanent fixture in their domestic calendar.

Teams
The following teams competed:

 Abahani Limited
 Bangladesh Krira Shikkha Protishtan
 Brothers Union
 Gazi Group Cricketers
 Khelaghar Samaj Kallyan Samity
 Legends of Rupganj
 Mohammedan Sporting Club
 Prime Bank Cricket Club
 Prime Doleshwar Sporting Club
 Sheikh Jamal Dhanmondi Club
 Shinepukur Cricket Club
 Uttara Sporting Club

Points tables

Group A

Group B

Group C

Group D

 Teams qualified for the Semi-finals.

Fixtures

Group stage

Group A

Group B

Group C

Group D

Finals

References

External links
 Series home at ESPN Cricinfo

2018-19 T20
Dhaka Premier Division Twenty20 Cricket League
2019 in Bangladeshi cricket
Bangladeshi cricket seasons from 2000–01